Ray Oliver Donels (March 19, 1902 – April 15, 1973) was an American football coach. He served as head football coach at Iowa State University from 1941 until midway through the 1942 season, compiling a record of 3–8–1. He resigned on October 14, 1942.

Donels was coach of the Iowa State freshman football and basketball teams for the 1938 season. As the football coach with Kenny Wells at Ames High School, the Little Cyclones won every game in its 1937 fall season schedule. Donels also coached the Ames High boys basketball team for nine seasons from 1929 until 1938, compiling a 127–65 overall record. Ames won the 1936 state championship under Donels' direction.

Donels was born in Shellsburg, Iowa. He attended Iowa State as an undergraduate in the class of 1928. He became a brother of Delta Chi Fraternity on October 13, 1923 when the fraternity chapter celebrated its chartering at Iowa State. Donels died on April 15, 1973 at a hospital in Rochester, Minnesota.

Head coaching record

Notes

References

External links
 

1902 births
1973 deaths
Iowa State Cyclones football coaches
Iowa State Cyclones men's basketball coaches
High school basketball coaches in Iowa
Iowa State University alumni
People from Benton County, Iowa